Nru-siṃha-nāth is a small village,3 KM from Paikmal nearest town is Paikmal temple and tourist spot located in Bargarh District of Western Odisha.

Significance 

The word Narasimha means half-man and half-lion Nātha means owner or Lord. The half-woman-half-lion is called Sphinx in Egypt and Manticore in Persia. In Hindu culture, Nrusimha or Nara-Sinha is one of the 10 Avataras or Incarnations of god Vishnu.

Image gallery

References 

 http://www.orissa.gov.in/e-magazine/Orissareview/june2006/engpdf/150-157.pdf
 Advances in Limnology By Mishra - page no 223-224
 Introducing Orissa By Balaram Mohanty - page no 102
 History of library development By B. D. Panda - page no.59
 Conservation and Utilization of Medicinal and Aromatic Plants By S Sahoo - page no. 22
 Yogadas : Nrusimha Charita (Edited by N.Pruseth),Padampur: Dora Art Press
 The environmentalism of the poor: a study of ecological conflicts and valuation By Juan Martinez-Alier -page no. 261
 Tourism directory, Orissa by Orissa (India). Dept. of Tourism & Cultural Affairs - page no. 69
 Land and people of Indian states and union territories: in 36 volumes. Odisha By S. C. Bhatt, Gopal K. Bhargava - page no. 418, 419
 Orissa Govt. e-magazine - Orissa Review - July 2003 - page no. 103, 104, 105
 Encyclopaedia of tourism resources in India, Volume 2 By Manohar Sajnani Page no. 280
 India, a reference annual - by Ministry of Information and Broadcasting. Publications Division. India. page no. 739

External links 

 on Facebook
 on Panoramio
 Temple Art, Kirtimukha, Roaring Lion and Flying Vidyadharas
 Navaratna Journal Jan-Feb 2008 Page 7 - Study on Cultural Heritage of Bargarh District
 Tourism Website of Bargarh
 Gandhamardan Hill Trek

Hindu temples in Odisha
Villages in Bargarh district